Taraqi-ye Kord (also Romanized as Ţarāqī-ye Kord and Ţarāqī Kord; also known as Ţarāqī-ye ‘Alīkāllū and Taraqt Kord) is a village in Aladagh Rural District, in the Central District of Bojnord County, North Khorasan Province, Iran. At the 2006 census, its population was 634, in 153 families.

References 

Populated places in Bojnord County